Rashid Morai, original name Syed Rashid Ali Shah was born on 5 March 1944 at village Joraloe Taluka Moro Naushahro Feroze District. He was an activist, poet of resistance and teacher. He died on 24 March 2014.

Early life
His father Syed Saeed Ali “Khadim” who was also a folk and classical poet evacuated from their parental village due to flood had demolished their village. They came and settled in Moro town, where their family remained so far.

Education
Rashid Morai, got Master of Arts and Bachelor of Education, and entered in professional career, he was appointed as a teacher.

Literary career
From forefather, Rashid Morai had a poetic family. His father was a good classical poet, even his brothers Syed Roshan Ali Shah (Pen name Roshan) and Syed Masoom Ali Shah (Pen name Nimarno) were also poets. Rashid Morai got poetic sense from his family. He had written several songs and poetry which is sung by various Sindhi singers. His poetry gives the fragrance of revolutionary sentiments. His famous poetic lines are:

Political affiliation
He remained close fellow of G. M. Syed, who was great mystic philosopher and pioneer of Sindhi national movement. Rashid Morai’s major poetry is revolving on this movement and he wrote variety of poetry on Sindhi Nationalism.

Publications
Some of his famous books are: Sindhrri Jo Sodau (1970), Mahndi Sanda Geet (1986) and Dil jo Shahr (1993) and almost 50 books are still pending for publishing.

Awards
He received several awards like: Marvi Academy Medal, Latif Award, Sindhi Adabi Sangat Award etc.

Death
Rashid Morai died on 24 March 2014.

References

External links
 Interview with Rashid Morai

Pakistani poets
Sindhi-language poets
Sindhi people
1944 births
2014 deaths
Recipients of Latif Award